Dewi Liana Seriestha (born 7 September 1989) is a Malaysian singer, model as well as beauty pageant titleholder who was crowned Miss Malaysia World 2014. She represents her country at Miss World 2014 at London, United Kingdom where she placed as one of the Top 25 quarter-finalist and also became the first Malaysian to win the Miss World Talent award.

Early life
Seriestha was born in Kuching city centre but hails from Kampung Tematu, which is a residential neighbourhood in the Padawan suburban area of the city outside city limits.

Her father, Yudhi Seriestha is an Indonesian musician and singer of Chinese descent while her mother Catherine Noep anak Sigit is a Malaysian Bidayuh singer. She is the third of four siblings. She won a national singing competition, Bintang Kecil RTM in 2000. In 2005, she moved to Kuala Lumpur with her parents to pursue her career. Seriestha graduated from National Academy of Arts, Culture and Heritage (ASWARA) in November 2015.

Career

2005–2010: Mentor and Miss Fair & Lovely World Harvest Festival 2010
In 2005, Seriestha made her national television debut in a singing competition, Mentor, which was aired on TV3. She was only 16 and was the youngest finalist of the show. Seriestha also ventured into acting. In 2009–2010, she acted for Malay drama, Kembali, Nilai Cinta Diana and Patung Cinta for Radio Televisyen Malaysia.

In 2010, she joined a Sarawak-based beauty pageant Miss Fair & Lovely World Harvest Festival where she finished as first runner up and also a subsidiary title for Miss Talent.

2014–2016: World Championships of Performing Arts, Miss World 2014 and first single
In 2014, Seriestha was chosen to represent Malaysia at World Championships of Performing Arts. She won the gold medal for classical opera, three silver medals for contemporary, world music and variety category (vocal), a special accolade under Industry Award and a medal for classical champion of WCOPA. In August 2014, she was crowned as Miss World Malaysia 2014 at Corus Hotel, Kuala Lumpur where she had the rights to be the representative for Malaysia in Miss World 2014 held in London. She won the Miss World Talent title and was named one of the Top 25 quarter-finalist.

During the Eid al-Fitr in 2015, Seriestha joined other 10 celebrities for a charity show held in Kuching, Sarawak alongside Malaysian pop diva, Ziana Zain for the show "Aidilfitri with Ziana Zain & Friends".

On 4 September 2015, Seriestha releases her first single, Hati Telah Dimiliki on Spotify and iTunes. The single is the theme song for a TV3 series, Waris Kasih.

In November 2015, she  was awarded Asia Outstanding Achievement Award during the Asia Golden Dragon Awards 2015/2016 for her series of achievements during the WCOPA as well as the Miss World 2014.

She performed at the national-level Chinese New Year open house at Sibu Town Square in February 2016. The event was attended by the then Prime Minister of Malaysia, Najib Razak. In July 2016, she announced that her second single is still in the works and she would be signing with Warner Music Malaysia. She composed the single herself.

In December 2016, She  performed at the national-level Christmas open house at Pavilion Kuala Lumpur alongside David Arumugam, Cassidy Anderson and Michael Leaner. The event was attended by the then Deputy Prime Minister of Malaysia, Ahmad Zahid Hamidi, Tourism and Culture Minister Mohamed Nazri Abdul Aziz, Transport Minister Liow Tiong Lai and Human Resources Minister Richard Riot Anak Jaem

2017–present: Second single, new label and first English single
Seriestha's second single, "Seindah Berdua" was released to digital platforms such as iTunes, Apple Music and Spotify on 20 January 2017, under Warner Music Malaysia. In May 2017, she was chosen as the icon and a keynote speaker for International Dayak Culture Day in Bengkayang Regency, Indonesia. She was also crowned as The Most Beautiful Dayak Woman during the Dayak Culture Day 2017.

In July 2018, she performed in a musical theater, Sarawak: An Indigenous Journey. The musical theater is held in conjunction with the second edition of Rainforest Fringe Festival, a run-up to the Rainforest World Music Festival.

In October 2018, it was announced that her single "Seindah Berdua" has advanced into the semi-finals of the 33rd Anugerah Juara Lagu.

Seriestha's first English single, "I Love You" was released on 1 February 2019. The song was co-written by herself and Mark Woods. The music video for the single was released on YouTube on 24 April 2019.

In June 2019, she performed alongside Dennis Lau, Namewee, Aisyah Aziz, Jeryl Lee, Lee Elaine, Jimmy Sax, Dennis Yin, NAMA, and Fara Dolhadi for The Chosen by Dennis Lau & Friends Concert held at Mega Star Arena, Kuala Lumpur. The concert represents the start of Lau's Give Back movement in collaboration with Teach For Malaysia (TFM).

Other ventures

Product endorsements
In October 2015, Seriestha signed a two-year contract as an ambassador with Furley Bioextracts range of Mangosteen products for Spray8 Wound Care, Beaute & Ostania.

Discography

Singles

As lead artist

As featured artist

Promotional singles

Music videos

Concerts and tours

As supporting act
"Dennis Lau & Friends: The Chosen Concert", Mega Star Arena, Kuala Lumpur (2019)
"Bersama Merentas Zaman Concert" by Petronas, KLCC Plaza, Kuala Lumpur (2019)
"Konsert Hari Wanita Sedunia" (International Women's Day Concert), Auditorium DBKL, Kuala Lumpur (2020)
"Sarawak's Diva Duo: Dewi & Jolynn In Concert", TVS, Kuching (2022)
"2022 Citrawarna Keluarga Malaysia Concert", Kuching Waterfront, Kuching (2022)
"I Want To Break Free! Queen Tribute Concert", Borneo Convention Centre Kuching, Kuching (2022)

Filmography

Theater credits

Awards and nominations

Citations

General sources 
 Yayasan John Jinep (2017). Dewi Liana Seriestha: A Portrait in Words and Pictures. Kuching, Sarawak: Dayak Bidayuh National Association. . .

External links
 
 

1989 births
21st-century Malaysian women singers
Bidayuh people
Indonesian people of Chinese descent
Indonesian people of Malaysian descent
Indonesian Christians
Living people
Malaysian actresses
Malaysian beauty pageant winners
Malaysian Christians
Malaysian women pop singers
Malaysian people of Chinese descent
Malaysian people of Indonesian descent
Miss World 2014 delegates
People from Kuching
People from Sarawak